Wan Dihuan (born 1907, date of death unknown) was a Chinese filmmaker. Born in Nanjing, China, he was one of the Wan brothers who pioneered the Chinese animation industry. His date of birth is unknown.

History
Wan Dihuan assisted his brothers in pioneering many of the film projects up until 1932, when he voluntarily left the Great Wall Film Company for his own photography studio. It is unknown as to whether he succeeded in starting the studio, since the Second Sino-Japanese War would take shape by 1937. It is believed that he only came back in 1941 to assist with Princess Iron Fan and 1964 Havoc in Heaven.

Filmography

References

External links
 China Movie DB

1907 births
Year of death missing
Film directors from Jiangsu
20th-century Chinese inventors
Cinema pioneers
Artists from Nanjing
Chinese animated film directors
Chinese animated film producers